Addis Abebe (born September 5, 1970) is a former long-distance runner from Ethiopia, best known for winning a bronze medal in the 10,000 metres at the 1992 Summer Olympics.

International competitions

Personal bests 
5000 metres - 13:58.08 (1988)
10,000 metres - 27:17.82 (1989)
Half marathon - 1:02:40 (1998)

External links

1970 births
Living people
Ethiopian male long-distance runners
Olympic male long-distance runners
Olympic athletes of Ethiopia
Olympic bronze medalists for Ethiopia
Olympic bronze medalists in athletics (track and field)
Athletes (track and field) at the 1992 Summer Olympics
Athletes (track and field) at the 2004 Summer Olympics
World Athletics Championships athletes for Ethiopia
Goodwill Games medalists in athletics
Medalists at the 1992 Summer Olympics
Competitors at the 1990 Goodwill Games
20th-century Ethiopian people